Broadway is a major thoroughfare in the downtown area in Nashville, Tennessee. It includes Lower Broadway, an entertainment district renowned for honky tonks and live country music.

The street is also home to retail shops, restaurants, dessert spots, tourist attractions, and a few hotels.

History
Originally named Broad Street, the eastern end of Broadway ended at the shipping docks on the Cumberland River. It was one of the first roads to run east–west in Nashville, and the first public high school in the city was built on the road in 1875. It eventually became a street lined with hardware stores, feed stores, and various other businesses and had a section known as "Auto Row" at the beginning of the 20th century due to large numbers of car dealers and tire and auto shops. A new post office – now the Frist Center for the Visual Performing Arts – was built next to Union Station on Broadway by the Works Progress Administration (WPA) during the Great Depression.

Jimmie Rodgers started performing in bars along Broadway near the river in the 1930s. His success eventually attracted other performers, and a thriving music scene developed on Lower Broadway – the section of Broadway that runs from 1st Avenue to 5th Avenue. The popularity of Broadway declined for a time after the Grand Ole Opry left Ryman Auditorium in 1974, but the area came back to life when the Opry moved some shows back to the Ryman in the 1990s.

Today, the historical buildings are home to retail shops and restaurants in addition to honky tonks. The official Nashville Convention & Visitors Corporation page defines a honky tonk as "an establishment that contains at least one rockin' stage, cold beverages, and a party that lasts all day, every day." Live music plays in most bars and restaurants along Lower Broadway from as early as 10 a.m. to 3 a.m. or even later each day, which is how the street came to be known as "Honky Tonk Highway". The venues don't have cover charges, and established music artists sometimes make appearances to perform with the up-and-comers. Many famous stars have gotten their starts in these venues, including Dierks Bentley, Gretchen Wilson, Willie Nelson, Johnny Cash, Blake Shelton, and Kris Kristofferson.

Broadway divides downtown Nashville into North of Broadway and South of Broadway (SoBro).

Historical Landmarks 
The entire Lower Broad district was added to the National Register of Historic Places in 1980. Additionally, several locations farther down Broadway are registered historical landmarks.

 Union Station Hotel: Listed on the National Register of Historic Places in 1969, Union Station started out as a train station in the 19th century. The lobby contains stained glass that is more than 100 years old and 65-foot vaulted ceilings. Along with late Victorian Romanesque Revival architecture, the hotel's Art Deco interior is decorated with original art that honors the city's music history.
 Frist Center for the Visual Arts: In addition to hosting national and international shows, the Frist displays the works of local and regional artists. Located in a Grecian Moderne-style marble building that previously housed a historic U.S. post office, the museum was added to the National Register of Historic Places in 1984.
 Hume-Fogg High School: The two towers of this historical building feature Norman-Gothic-style architecture. The overall look resembles a medieval European castle, making the four-story building a common spot for photos. The school was added to the National Register of Historic Places in 1974.
 Federal Office Building (Customs House): Designed by William Potter in a Gothic Revival architectural style, this building was added to the National Register of Historic Places in 1972.
 Christ Church: With Gothic architecture designed by Francis Hatch Kimball, this church became an official historical landmark in 1978. It is still in use as a place of worship.

Location

The street starts at the convergence of 1st Avenue North and 1st Avenue South near the Cumberland River and runs southwest all the way to the campus of Vanderbilt University, where it takes a sharp southward turn and merges with 21st Avenue South.

It is bisected by the following streets/intersections:

 1st Avenue North/South
 2nd Avenue North/South
 3rd Avenue North/South
 4th Avenue North/South
 5th Avenue North/South
 7th Avenue North/South
 Rosa L. Parks Boulevard/8th Avenue South
 11th Avenue North/South
 12th Avenue North/South
 George L. Davis Boulevard/13th Avenue South
 14th Avenue North/South
 16th Avenue North/South
 17th Avenue South 
 19th Avenue South
 Lyle Avenue

Concurrent Interstates 40 and 65 run beneath Broadway between 13th and 14th Avenues and are accessible via adjacent ramps on George L. Davis Boulevard and 14th Avenue South. Broadway is accessible from the interstates at Exit 209A (I-40 W/I-65 N) and 209B (I-40 E/I-65 S).

From 1st Avenue to 16th Avenue, Broadway serves as the "dividing line" between the north and south designations of the avenues. From 1st Avenue to 13th Avenue, Broadway serves as U.S. Route 70. From 8th Avenue to its merger with 21st Avenue South, Broadway serves as U.S. Route 431.

Transportation 
Broadway functions as a traditional street with both vehicle and bicycle traffic. Various shuttles, buses, and taxis operate in the area. The Music City Star commuter train also stops at Riverfront Station near the end of Broadway by the river.

Entertainment and restaurants 

Here are some potential attractions and entertainment joints:

Hard Rock Café: Positioned at the edge of Riverfront Park, the Nashville Hard Rock has live bands playing in the Reverb Room. The area known as the Ledge provides a view of the Cumberland River and downtown.

Acme Feed & Seed: Located in a 100-year-old building that formerly sold grain, this venue is now a very large (22,000 square feet), multi-level restaurant and live music spot. The rooftop bar has a view of the Cumberland River, Nissan Stadium, and the Broadway strip. Dining options include a sushi bar on the second floor and street-style local classics in the main dining area.

Nashville Underground: This 40,000-square-foot honky tonk located near the end of Broadway close to the Cumberland River has four floors with bars, food, live music, and a mechanical bullref></ref> The full menu includes southern dishes, bar foods, and specialty items.

Rock Bottom Restaurant and Brewery: This venue focuses on craft brews in addition to live music, which plays nightly on the rooftop bar.

Bootleggers Inn: This Nashville moonshine bar serves drinks with southern-inspired moonshine flavors like peach and apple pie. Live bands play on two floors.

Ole Red: Owned by Blake Shelton as part of a collaboration with the Grand Ole Opry, this honky tonk has a rooftop with a view of Broadway to go with multiple floors of entertainment and a full menu.

Jason Aldean's Kitchen + Rooftop Bar: Country star Jason Aldean created the menu of southern-style dishes himself for his honky tonk. The rooftop bar is the largest on Broadway, and a gift shop sells themed memorabilia.

Tequila Cowboy: This large complex includes five different types of venues in one. The Rock Bar has live bands every night, and WannaB's hosts karaoke. Karma Lounge has a dance floor and plays top 40s music. The second floor has a mechanical bull, and the game room has pool tables and TVs tuned in to games.

Crazy Town: Open since 2016, this bar has two floors and a rooftop bar with a DJ playing a mix of Top 40 and throwback music. Live bands play on the first and second floors, and the décor includes reclaimed barn walls, hanging guitars, and a barber's chair for taking photos. The "Crazy Town Burger" is a top menu choice.

Whiskey Bent Saloon: This saloon hosts live country music on the main floor with multiple bars and a VIP loft. Private event space is available upstairs.

The Valentine: This honky tonk has a 1920s/1930's Prohibition-era vibe spread across four floors, including a rooftop bar and private event spaces. Live bands play on the first two floors, and a DJ entertains dancers on the third floor. The full-service restaurant serves local dishes and bar classics.

Tin Roof: Located in the former Hatch Show Print building, this red-white-and-blue-themed honky tonk describes its menu as "Better Than Bar Food".

Broadway Brewhouse and Mojo Grill: This restaurant located in the former Harley-Holt Furniture Co. building has a robust beer selection and a menu filled with Cajun and southwestern-style dishes in addition to bar favorites.

Honky Tonk Central: This three-story venue has live country music seven days a week, and the site hosts special events and parties. The menu includes bar favorites.

Jimmy Buffett's Margaritaville: The live music at Margaritaville ranges from country classics to Jimmy Buffett-style tunes and interactive shows that get the crowd in on the act. The menu has American classics along with island-inspired dishes.

Dierks Bentley's Whiskey Row: Owned by Dierks Bentley, this branch of Whiskey Row is the first one outside of his home state of Arizona. The gastropub has a brunch menu in addition to lunch and dinner options.

Merchants Restaurant: This restaurant has a more sophisticated atmosphere than most establishments on Broadway. Management classifies the menu as New American and New Southern dishes.

Nudie's Honky Tonk: Named for Nudie Cohn – the former tailor known for making rhinestone-studded "Nudie suits" for stars like Elvis Presley, Hank Williams, and Elton John – this bar spreads across three floors in a historic 100-year-old building. The interior includes two stages, multiple bars, and rare memorabilia, such as sparkling costumes and a customized "Nudie mobile". The menu is made up of southern favorites.

Bailey's Sports Grille: This sports bar is more about watching games and shooting pool than live music, but it still has a small stage in the corner for live bands. The menu includes typical bar and grill fare.

The Stage on Broadway: With a long history as a spot for celebrity performances and sightings, this honky tonk focuses primarily on country music with some occasional rock 'n roll. Three bands play on two floors and on the rooftop patio, and an original oil painting of The Highwaymen greets guests from its position over the front door.

Paradise Park Trailer Resort: Despite its name, the "P-Park" is actually a greasy spoon-bar combo and not a resort. With a "trailer" theme that includes tire chandeliers, lawn furniture, and a Mullet Wall of Fame, this bar is a casual spot for songwriters and musicians to play.

Jack's Bar-B-Que: Jack's is distinctive for the flying pigs on its neon sign as well as its Texas-style barbecue and variety of sauce options.

Robert's Western World: Located in a historic building used for various purposes over the years, this honky tonk started out as a western clothing and boot store in the early 1990s before eventually evolving into a live music venue with a bar and grill. Robert's still has boots and apparel for sale alongside bar-style menu items. The bar is known for their preservation of traditional country music, and is known for acts such as BR549 and Brazilbilly.

Layla's Bluegrass Inn: This bar offers bluegrass, rockabilly, Americana, and numerous other types of music in addition to country. Past performers include Hank Williams III, Chris Scruggs, and Ralph Stanley. The simple menu consists of snack foods.

The Second Fiddle: This honky tonk focuses on traditional country music seven days a week in a setting filled with photo-lined walls and music memorabilia like antique radios and vintage instruments.

AJ's Good Time Bar: Owned by Alan Jackson, this honky tonk has three floors featuring Alan Jackson memorabilia and country music. Located in the oldest building on Broadway, the bar is the former home of various businesses, including Bullet Records – a label started in 1946 to record Grand Ole Opry members. Billboard Magazine voted AJ's best honky tonk in Nashville. An additional bar on the roof offers views of the city.

Nashville Crossroads: Open since 2004, this honky tonk hosts southern rock bands as well as classic country artists.

Tootsie's Orchid Lounge: With four stages and three bars spread across three floors, this orchid-colored honky tonk – a paint job mess up is how the bar got its name – is possibly the most well known on Broadway. The bar has been the subject of various articles, TV programs, and even songs over the years. Past performers include Patsy Cline, Willie Nelson, Johnny Cash, Tom T. Hall, Kris Kristofferson, and many others. Tootsie's "Wall of Fame" includes hundreds of photos and other memorabilia.

Mellow Mushroom: This pizzeria pays tribute to Nashville's music history with themed art created by local and regional artists displayed on five different floors.

Legends Corner: With walls covered with album covers, this bar has a nostalgic atmosphere to go with the live country music.

Rippy's Smokin' Bar and Grill: With the largest of three stages on the roof, Rippy's offers a view of Lower Broadway. The interior includes a main dining area and an area with sports games on big screen TVs. The menu mainly focuses on barbecue-related items.

FGL House: Owned by Tyler Hubbard and Brian Kelley of Florida Georgia Line, FGL House is a multi-level restaurant and bar. It has one of the largest rooftops, the “Cruise” rooftop, that Nashville has to offer, dedicated to an all-day and "almost" all-night party with views of the Music City skyline. It also features a large video wall continuously showcases video content from Florida Georgia Line and other country stars – as well as displaying sporting events.

Luke's 32 Bridge: Owned by Luke Bryan, Luke's 32 Bridge invites guests inside a 30,000 sq ft multi-level entertainment facility, featuring 6 levels, 8 bars, 4 stages with the best live music and two restaurants. On top of all this, Luke Bryan's 'Crash My Party Rooftop Patio' is one of downtown's largest rooftop bars.

Casa Rosa: Owned by Miranda Lambert, Casa Rosa is a four-floor restaurant and venue that features three floors of live entertainment and a rooftop bar. Casa Rosa is decked out with memorabilia from Miranda's illustrious career, including costumes from her videos and the birdcage featured in the video for "Bluebird." It opened in May 2021 and is the first establishment in the district owned by a female artist.

Friends in Low Places Bar and Honky-Tonk: Owned by Garth Brooks, the Friends in Low Places Bar and Honky-Tonk will be a three-level honky tonk with 40,000 square feet of space. The bar and restaurant is expected to open on Broadway within the next couple of years.

Hotels 
Construction is set to be completed on the new Marriott Moxy Hotel on the second block of Lower Broadway by the end of 2018. Currently, the hotel options on Broadway are located farther down the street, away from the Lower Broadway area.

 Holiday Inn Express – Downtown
 Union Station Hotel
 Hilton Garden Inn – Vanderbilt
 Embassy Suites – Vanderbilt
 Kimpton Aertson Hotel

Shopping 
The Lower Broadway area has various souvenir and specialty – many western-themed – shops along both sides of the road. Additionally, some of the bars and attractions have their own gift shops, such as Legend's Gift Shop inside Legend's Corner.

Ernest Tubb Record Shop: Founded in 1947 by Ernest Tubb, the "Texas Troubadour", this historic shop is the broadcast site of the Midnight Jamboree on WSM 650 AM. Autographed photos line the walls, and records, sheet music, and memorabilia line the shelves.

Savannah's Candy Kitchen of Nashville: This sweet shop makes and serves everything from chocolate candies to homemade ice cream and candy apples.

Cotton Eye Joe's Gift Shop: This shop sells typical souvenirs like T-shirts as well as western-themed items.

Lower Broadway has several boot stores within a few blocks, including:

 Boot Barn
 Boot Country
 Betty Boots
 Big Time Boots
 Broadway Boot Company

Dixieland Delights: This souvenir shop has themed T-shirts, hats, music memorabilia, and various other types of keepsakes.

Music City Shop at the Visitor Center: Located inside the Nashville Visitor Center (inside the glass tower at Bridgestone Arena), this gift shop sells a lot of music-themed items, such as clothing and memorabilia.

Music City Showcase: This shop has music memorabilia, T-shirts, hats, novelty items, and various other types of tourist souvenirs.

Tourist attractions 
In addition to locations for listening to live music and dining, Broadway has other sites that attract both locals and tourists.

Bridgestone Arena: This arena seats almost 20,000 people and is home to the Nashville Predators, the Nashville Visitors Center, and the Tennessee Sports Hall of Fame. It hosts everything from concerts and the CMA Awards to sports events and Broadway shows throughout the year.

Riverfront Station and Riverfront Park: The site of big celebrations like fireworks for Independence Day, this park on the bank of the Cumberland River has trails, a dog park, and an amphitheater for live music performances. The adjoining train station is the western endpoint of the Music City Star rail system for commuters.

Nearby attractions 
Some of the city's most popular attractions are located very near Lower Broadway on some of the cross streets:

 1st Avenue: Fort Nashborough, Ascend Amphitheater
 2nd Avenue: George Jones Museum
 3rd Avenue: Johnny Cash Museum, Patsy Cline Museum
 4th Avenue: Nashville Symphony, Music City of Walk of Fame Park, Nashville Music Garden
 5th Avenue: Country Music Hall of Fame, Hatch Show Print, Ryman Auditorium, Music City Center
 6th Avenue: The Hermitage Hotel, Tennessee Performing Arts Center, War Memorial Auditorium & Military Branch Museum
 Charlotte Avenue: Tennessee State Capitol (between 6th and 7th Avenues)

References

External links
 

Streets in Nashville, Tennessee
Culture of Nashville, Tennessee
Entertainment districts in the United States
U.S. Route 70
U.S. Route 431